Group E of UEFA Euro 2020 took place from 14 to 23 June 2021 in Saint Petersburg's Krestovsky Stadium and Seville's La Cartuja. The group contained host nation Spain, Sweden, Poland and Slovakia.

The matches were originally scheduled to be played at Bilbao's San Mamés and Dublin's Aviva Stadium. However, due to a lack of guarantees regarding spectators caused by the COVID-19 pandemic, UEFA announced on 23 April 2021 that the matches scheduled in Bilbao were moved to Seville, and the group stage matches scheduled in Dublin were reallocated to Saint Petersburg.

Teams

Notes

Standings

In the round of 16,
The winner of Group E, Sweden, advanced to play the third-placed team of Group C, Ukraine.
The runner-up of Group E, Spain, advanced to play the runner-up of Group D, Croatia.

Matches

Poland vs Slovakia

Spain vs Sweden

Sweden vs Slovakia

Spain vs Poland

Slovakia vs Spain

Sweden vs Poland

Discipline
Fair play points were to be used as a tiebreaker if the head-to-head and overall records of teams were tied (and if a penalty shoot-out was not applicable as a tiebreaker). These were calculated based on yellow and red cards received in all group matches as follows:
yellow card = 1 point
red card as a result of two yellow cards = 3 points
direct red card = 3 points
yellow card followed by direct red card = 4 points

Only one of the above deductions was applied to a player in a single match.

Notes

References

External links

Group E overview at UEFA.com

UEFA Euro 2020
Spain at UEFA Euro 2020
Sweden at UEFA Euro 2020
Poland at UEFA Euro 2020
Slovakia at UEFA Euro 2020